Nectandra psammophila is a species of plant in the family Lauraceae.

It is endemic to the Atlantic Forest ecoregion of Southeastern Brazil.

It is threatened by habitat loss.

References

psammophila
Endemic flora of Brazil
Flora of the Atlantic Forest
Flora of Bahia
Flora of Espírito Santo
Flora of Minas Gerais
Flora of Rio de Janeiro (state)
Endangered flora of South America
Taxonomy articles created by Polbot